Enzo Cavazzoni (2 March 1932 – 15 August 2012) was an Italian water polo player who competed in the 1956 Summer Olympics.

He was born in Genoa and died in Victoria, British Columbia, Canada.

In 1956 he was a member of the Italian team which finished fourth in the Olympic tournament. He played five matches as goalkeeper.

See also
 Italy men's Olympic water polo team records and statistics
 List of men's Olympic water polo tournament goalkeepers

External links
 
 Enzo Cavazzoni's obituary

1932 births
2012 deaths
Water polo players from Genoa
Italian male water polo players
Water polo goalkeepers
Olympic water polo players of Italy
Water polo players at the 1956 Summer Olympics